St. John the Evangelist's Church in Paczków, Poland, is a Gothic church built in the fourteenth-century. The church belongs to the Roman Catholic Diocese of Opole. 

The beginning of the church's construction began in the year 1350 and lasted around 30 years. The shrine was funded by Bishop of Wrocław Preczlaw of Pogarell, who administered between 1341 and 1376. The present form of the church is in the Renaissance, Baroque and Neo-Gothic architectural styles. In the fifteenth-century, from the chancel's southern side, there was built a spanning chapel, dedicated to Holy Virgin Mary. The tower, partially deconstructed in 1429, was rebuilt in 1462. It was then that the upper condignation was constructed.

References

Nysa County
Paczków